Rod J. Rohrich, F.A.C.S. is a Dallas-based plastic surgeon, author and educator. He is the editor-in-chief of the journal Plastic and Reconstructive Surgery and a founding member of the Dallas Plastic Surgery Institute and the Alliance in Reconstructive Surgery. 

He is board certified by the American Board of Plastic Surgery. A June 2014 journal article in Annals of Plastic Surgery recognized Rohrich as one of the "10 most influential surgeons of the current era" after surveying the American Council of Academic Plastic Surgeons (ACAPS) and the Southeastern Society of Plastic and Reconstructive Surgeons (SESPRS). In 2021, Newsweek recognized Dr. Rohrich as the top ranked plastic surgeon in the United States for both rhinoplasty surgery and facelift surgery.

Early life and education
Rohrich grew up in rural North Dakota. He completed his undergraduate and postgraduate education at North Dakota State University and the University of North Dakota, then earned his medical degree from Baylor College of Medicine. After general surgery and plastic surgery residencies at the University of Michigan Medical Center, he did further training in pediatric plastic surgery at Oxford University in England, and a hand and microvascular fellowship at Massachusetts General Hospital/Harvard Medical School.

Career
Rohrich joined the Division of Plastic Surgery at UT Southwestern Medical Center in Dallas in 1986 and succeeded Fritz E. Barton as department chair in 1991. In 2003 he was elected president of the American Society of Plastic Surgeons for the year 2004. In 2005, Rohrich was appointed editor-in-chief of the journal, Plastic & Reconstructive Surgery.

Rohrich was chairman of the UT-Southwestern plastic surgery department when it became the largest plastic surgery department in the country, and helped to open an outpatient plastic surgery clinic. Until 2014, Rohrich was one of highest paid state employees in Texas as a University of Texas Southwestern Medical Center faculty member. He stepped down as chairman of the Department of Plastic Surgery at UT Southwestern Medical Center after "an allegation of unprofessional conduct." In 2016, he resigned from UT Southwestern Medical Center, and was later a founding partner at the Dallas Plastic Surgery Institute.

He is a clinical professor of plastic surgery at the Baylor College of Medicine and has been the president of the Association of Academic Chairs of Plastic Surgery, The Rhinoplasty Society, the Dallas Society of Plastic Surgeons, the Texas Society of Plastic Surgeons, as well as a chair on the Residency Review Committee for Plastic Surgery and American Board of Plastic Surgery.

Rohrich was recognized as one of the top plastic surgeons in the United States by Castle Connolly's Top Doctor Program for 2019. He is author or coauthor of 900 scientific articles, 50 textbook chapters in plastic surgery, and editor of 5 plastic surgery textbooks or monographs.

Selected bibliography

Rohrich, Rod J; Adams Jr, William P; Ahmad, Jamil (2014). Rhinoplasty: Nasal Surgery by the Masters. pp. 1706.

References

External links

1953 births
Living people
Baylor University alumni
North Dakota State University alumni
University of Michigan Medical School alumni
Harvard Medical School people
University of Texas Southwestern Medical Center faculty
Fellows of the American College of Surgeons